Astronomy is the scientific study of celestial objects.

Astronomy may also refer to:

 Astronomy (magazine), an amateur American astronomy periodical
 Astronomy (Dragonland album), an album by Swedish power metal band Dragonland
 Astronomy (Bleach album)
 "Astronomy" (song), by American rock band Blue Öyster Cult
 "Astronomy Domine", a song by British psychedelic rock band Pink Floyd
 "Astronomy" (Conan Gray song)

See also